Walk with Me is a 2021 American independent romantic drama film written and directed by Isabel del Rosal. Devin Dunne Cannon stars as a 30-year-old mother who leaves her husband, then unexpectedly falls in love with another woman, played by Bridget Barkan.

Plot
At the age of 30 and with a young daughter, Amber Evans decides to leave her husband named Ethan and the life she once had and live somewhere new. Along the way, she meets a woman named Logan Pierce, who's a real estate agent, and offers her a house for her and her daughter named Emily, which she accepts. She then tells Ethan that she's leaving him for good and leaves to get her paperwork done for her new home. 

She then proceeds to move her stuff out of her husband's house and move into her new home. She then explains to Emily that she's going to be moving into her new house and that she'll be staying with her four days a week. Then Amber is working when she gets notified about the divorce papers and signs. 

Amber then walks to a local wine shop and encounters Logan, which she figures out that she lives in the same neighborhood that she moved into. Logan asks Amber if she's settling in okay which Amber says yes. Amber offers to have Logan come over for housewarming. Logan tells Amber that she respects Amber for her bravery for divorcing Ethan. 

Amber asks Logan what she likes to do and Logan tells Logan to meet her at a local bar on a Thursday night at a nightclub, where she discovers Logan is passionate at one thing. Singing. The two get to know each other more and establish a great friendship. While eating ice cream, Amber shows Logan that she's passionate about drawing. 

After an afternoon on the town, Logan admits to wanting to kiss Amber, to which Amber declines. At work, Amber texts Logan, and admits that she likes her romantically, to which Logan replies back with the same message. The two spend a night at a bar where the two dance to a song called "Sweet Heat". 

The two then spend a morning at the beach and Amber tells Logan of a hobby that she did when she was a little kid, where she and her mother threw rocks into the ocean for things like stress relief, which Logan does it too. Emily comes back from Ethan's and she and Ethan get introduced to Logan. 

Amber then comes up with a game to have Logan wear a blindfold and guess a specific chocolate. After Logan eates one, Amber kisses Logan on the lips but immediately tries to backpedal stating that she has wants to be with Logan and has major feelings for her, but doesn't know what to do with that. However, after Logan says that she likes the feeling about being closer, the two kiss again.

Sol, Amber's boss, tries to ask Amber to tell her who she's dating, which Amber refuses. Amber and Logan arrive at the subway which Logan sees her parents, which her mom says that she's mistaken her for somebody else which sends Logan into a breakdown and leaves the subway in a huff. Amber comforts her and they go back to Amber's house.

After Logan calms down, she asks to watch Amber draw, until she says she can't stop herself from falling in love with her. The two then engage in passionate sex.

Afterwards, Amber and Logan attend a concert that has Emily playing a piano, to which Logan telling her she did good. A group of ladies offers Amber to have dinner with them and Logan leaves. Logan gets upset because Amber didn't kiss her and Amber explains she didn't because there were kids and other couples there. Logan says that she prefers to be treated like she exists and she didn't feel like Amber was treating her that way. Amber says that the last thing that she wants to do is hurt Logan. Logan forgives Amber. The two start getting along more and they pick up where they left off.

Logan then lets Amber in on a little secret that she's going to be leaving for tour because she's a singer and she offers to let Amber go on tour with her and bring Emily with her. Amber refuses because she still has her job and loves it. However she tells Logan that she loves her, and Logan says it back.

Amber gets with Sol at work and admits to her that she's with Logan. Sol tells her that she was in love with a white man and wanted to spend every moment with him but decided not to continue the relationship. Sol tells her to "step into her life before it passes by". 

Logan then gets introduced to Amber's parents and they have dinner. Amber's parents state that they are grateful for Logan's friendship with Amber. Logan says she needs to leave to meet a client and Amber offers to walk her out only for the two to make out and Grace (Amber's mom) to catch them. The two leave and Logan tells Amber to "stand tall next to her" and Amber tells her that she "needs more time". Grace acts if everything is okay and Amber says yes and Logan leaves.While in bed, Amber asks Logan to "not let her fuck up the relationship" but then backpedals by saying that she loves Logan and Logan replies with the same thing. 

Amber then gets called to Ethan's house and she gets informed that her parents informed that they told Ethan about her relationship with Logan. Ethan informs Amber that he got a job out of state and he's leaving in a few weeks.  After Ethan and her parents fight, Amber tells Ethan that she did love him, and Ethan tells her that he still loves her and that he feels regret for treating her like trash. Amber tells Ethan that she didn't like the person she was becoming, that they both failed the two of them in some way, and that Emily can't live without Ethan. Ethan says he has to leave because he already took the job.

Amber starts cooking when she informs Logan that Ethan's leaving and that it's a lot of change. Logan offers to help with Emily and Logan tells her that she wants to be a part of both Amber's life and Emily's life in a good way. Amber says it's "not the right time" and they talk outside.
Amber realizes that Logan has been more quiet lately and Logan tells her that she thinks they need to break up because she doesn't think that she can't love her from such a vulnerable place. Amber tries to convince Logan that she's ready for Logan to be a part of her life but fails. 

Time has passed and Logan has left for tour. At a playground while Emily was with Michael(Amber's dad) Grace explains to Amber that her relationship with Logan wasn't suitable for her nor Emily. Amber tries to say that Logan made her happy and alive and Grace says that it was never love and Amber leaves stating that Grace will lose her and Emily. Michael explains to Grace that there's nothing that they can do to change Amber's life, and Grace leaves. 

Emily and Amber hang out near the water and Emily gets upset about something and doesn't know. Amber tells her that whenever she's upset, she can talk to her at any time and they both throw rocks into the water.

Grace hangs out with Emily and they play cards together. Amber arrives to get Emily and Grace apologizes for her actions.Amber then has an art show and she achieves success with her artwor and artistic skills. After she leaves she listens to an interview on the radio with Logan talking about her new song titled "Hold On" and Logan states that she when she sung it to an audience for the first time, it was for Amber. 

Amber decides to fly to Toronto and see Logan due to advice from Sol. After seeing Logan perform, she goes backstage to see Logan. Logan is in amazement as Amber says she was incredible. Logan says she heard about Amber's art show and congratulates her. Amber says she missed Logan and she wants her back. The two then happily reunite.

Cast 
 Devin Dunne Cannon as Amber Evans
 Bridget Barkan as Logan Pierce, the woman Amber falls in love with
 Daniel Fox as Ethan, Amber's ex-husband
 Catrina Ganey as Sol, Amber's boss and mentor
 Nikki James as Grace, Amber's mother
 Malachy Cleary as Michael, Amber's father
 Kristen Vaughan as Linda Pierce, Logan's mother
 Grant Elisa Ginsberg as Emily, Amber's daughter

Distribution 
Walk with Me premiered at the Cinequest Film & Creativity Festival held in March 2021. It was an official selection of the Wicked Queer LGBTQ+ Film Festival in April 2021, where it was awarded an Honorable Mention in the Narrative Feature category. It was also an official selection of the 2021 OUTshine Film Festival and the 2021 Brooklyn Film Festival.

Reception 
Writing for Gay Star News, Rafaella Gunz said the film has "relatable characters and a passion that pulls the viewer in." The review website LesFlicks.com called it a "carefully crafted movie" with characters who have "been given meticulous backstory and depth."

Soundtrack 
Juno Award-nominated singer-songwriter Amanda Walther of the folk duo Dala wrote sixteen original songs for the film's soundtrack. Walther said, "I learned so much through this process of writing music for this film: to be brave yet patient with myself, focus on what really matters and love every step of life along the way."

References 

2021 films
2021 independent films
2021 romantic drama films
2021 LGBT-related films
American independent films
American romantic drama films
American LGBT-related films
Female bisexuality in film
Lesbian-related films
2020s English-language films
2020s American films